Hemaris thetis, the Rocky Mountain clearwing or California clearwing, is a moth of the family Sphingidae. The species was first described by Jean Baptiste Boisduval in 1855. It is found from Colorado, New Mexico, Montana, Idaho, Wyoming and Utah west to California and north to British Columbia. The habitat consists of streamsides and meadows in mountainous areas.

The wingspan is 35–50 mm. It is a diurnal species. The head and thorax are brownish olive or olive green. The abdomen is black or olive green above and yellow below, there is a broad yellow band. The wings have a narrow brown border and the clear parts of the wings have a steel-blue glow. The scaled areas of wings range from dark brown to light brownish orange. Each wing has a large transparent patch which covers most of the wing surface.

There is probably one generation per year with adults on wing from May to August. They feed on the nectar of various flowers, including Arctostaphylos uva-ursi and Lupinus species.

The larvae feed on Symphoricarpos species.

References

External links

T
Moths of North America
Fauna of the Rocky Mountains
Fauna of the Sierra Nevada (United States)
Fauna of the California chaparral and woodlands
Natural history of the California Coast Ranges
Moths described in 1855
Taxa named by Jean Baptiste Boisduval